The Lagonda Rapier was a small car produced by the British Lagonda company from 1934 to 1935. A few more were subsequently produced by the independent Rapier Car Company.

At the heart of the car was an all new 1104 cc twin overhead camshaft four-cylinder engine. The design of this was done by a consultant Thomas Ashcroft (known as Tim) with the brief of producing "Britain's finest 1100 cc engine". The engine was originally intended to be cast in light alloy but to save cost it was eventually made in cast iron using the original patterns making it rather heavy. It did, however, produce  at 5400 rpm, a very good output for the time. Production of the engine was sub-contracted to Coventry Climax.

The chassis was designed by Charles King and consisted of steel sections bolted together. The engine was connected to a four-speed preselector gearbox with right-hand change lever and the Girling system rod operated brakes had large  drums. Half-elliptic springs provided the suspension controlled by friction dampers.

The factory supplied the running chassis for £270 to customers who could then select their own coachwork. Most cars had bodies by E. D. Abbott Ltd of Farnham, Surrey. A complete car with Abbott four-seat tourer body sold for £368. Other suppliers of coachwork included John Charles, Maltby and E J Newns who made around 12, subsequently known as Eagles.

The engine was just too large for use in the popular 1100 cc class so a few cars were made with 1084 cc engines.

In 1935 the Lagonda company failed and was bought by Alan Good who reformed it as LG Motors (Staines) Ltd. As part of the general upheaval the rights to make the Rapier were sold to a new company Rapier Cars Ltd of Hammersmith Road, London, a premises previously used by Lagonda as their London service centre. The intention was now to sell the car complete with body and a design was produced by Ranalah. A four-seat tourer was priced at £375. Production continued until 1938 but only 46 cars were made.

See also
 List of car manufacturers of the United Kingdom

References

Rapier
1930s cars
Cars introduced in 1934